Live/Indian Summer is the first live album by Al Stewart, released in 1981. It was originally released as a double LP, with sides 2, 3 & 4 featuring live material while side 1 featured five new studio recordings. The side 1 tracks were recorded at Evergreen Studios, Los Angeles between June–August 1981, while the three live sides were recorded at The Roxy Theatre, Los Angeles in April 1981.

Although all musicians were credited, the band itself Shot in the Dark were uncredited on the album sleeve and label, which was the second and last album Stewart performed with them as his backing band. They are however introduced with Stewart before the first song of the live-set.

This album was never released on CD in its entirety until 2007, where previously, the five studio tracks were released as bonus tracks on the 24 Carrots CD re-releases, and the live tracks on the 1997 re-release, Live at the Roxy, Los Angeles 1981. The 2007 re-release includes all sixteen tracks on one compact disc.

Track listing

All tracks written by Al Stewart unless otherwise noted

Side 1 (studio)
"Here in Angola" – 4:37
"Pandora" (Al Stewart, Peter White) – 4:33 
"Indian Summer" – 3:33
"Delia's Gone" – 2:47
"Princess Olivia" – 3:21

Side 2 (live)
"Running Man" (Stewart, White) – 4:43
"Time Passages" (Stewart, White) – 6:26
"Merlin's Time" (Stewart, White) – 2:56
"If It Doesn't Come Naturally, Leave It" – 4:27

Side 3 (live)
"Roads to Moscow" – 8:13
"Nostradamus/World Goes To Riyadh" – 13:01

Side 4 (live)
"Soho (Needless To Say)" – 3:43
"On The Border" – 4:46
"Valentina Way"  – 4:17
"Clarence Frogman Henry" – 1:43
"Year of the Cat" (Stewart, Peter Wood) – 7:07

"Pandora" and "Indian Summer" are inverted on the RCA release.
Unlike the original LP release, all live tracks on the 1997 and 2007 re-releases are joined with crowd noise and have no fade outs.

Personnel

Al Stewart – vocals, acoustic guitar, electric guitar, synthesizer
Shot in the Dark
Peter White – keyboards, acoustic guitar, electric guitar, accordion
Adam Yurman – electric guitar, acoustic guitar, backing vocals
Robin Lamble – bass guitar, violin, backing vocals
Krysia Kristianne – keyboards, percussion, tin whistle, backing vocals
Bryan Savage – alto and tenor saxophones, flute

Additional musicians
Harry Stinson – drums, percussion, backing vocals
James SK Wān – French horn
Robert Alpert – keyboards
Steve Chapman – percussion
Technical
Aaron Rapoport – photography

Charts
Album – Billboard (United States)

References

Al Stewart albums
1981 albums
RCA Records live albums
Arista Records live albums
1981 live albums
Albums recorded at the Roxy Theatre